Alexander Hamilton Preparatory Academy (abbreviated as AHPA) is a four-year comprehensive public high school located in Elizabeth, in Union County, New Jersey, United States, operating as part of Elizabeth Public Schools. The academy accepts students in ninth through twelfth grades in Elizabeth who have passed the requirements for enrollment. The academy is operated by the Elizabeth Board of Education. The school has been accredited by the Middle States Association of Colleges and Schools Commission on Elementary and Secondary Schools since 2013. The school's college-preparatory curriculum prepares students for four-year colleges and universities.

As of the 2021–22 school year, the school had an enrollment of 961 students and 62.5 classroom teachers (on an FTE basis), for a student–teacher ratio of 15.4:1. There were 492 students (51.2% of enrollment) eligible for free lunch and 103 (10.7% of students) eligible for reduced-cost lunch.

Awards, recognition and rankings
The school was the 46th-ranked public high school in New Jersey out of 328 schools statewide according to U.S. News & World Report.

The school was the 204th-ranked public high school in New Jersey out of 339 schools statewide in New Jersey Monthly magazine's September 2014 cover story on the state's "Top Public High Schools", using a new ranking methodology. The school was the 303rd-ranked public high school in New Jersey out of 328 schools statewide in New Jersey Monthly magazine's September 2012 cover story on the state's "Top Public High Schools", the first time that the school was included in the magazine's rankings.

History
Alexander Hamilton Preparatory Academy was originally known as Alexander Hamilton Junior High School No. 2 (Alexander Hamilton Middle School in 2007), which had been constructed in 1924 to replace the Cherry Street School after it was demolished. The middle school became a high school during the summer of 2008.  The school was named after Alexander Hamilton, a one-time Elizabeth resident who served as the first Secretary of the Treasury and a Revolutionary War Leader who once resided and attended a school in Elizabeth back when the city was known as Elizabethtown.

Curriculum
Alexander Hamilton Preparatory Academy selects students with a grade point average of 2.0 or higher, who demonstrate academic potential and are committed to preparing for post-secondary education. Students will comply with a rigorous academic course sequence which includes: four years of English, four years of Mathematics, four years of Science, four years of Social Studies, three years of World Language, and one year of World Literature. eleventh and twelfth graders pursue a concentration in leadership studies.

Academic and elective courses
Alexander Hamilton Preparatory Academy offers major courses for students such as English I, II, II, Geometry, Algebra II, Pre-Calculus, Probability and Statistics, Trigonometry and plenty of Science classes such as Biology, Chemistry, Physics and Forensic Science. As a new independent high school, the academy is beginning to offer a few Advanced Placement Programs (AP) classes for students who wish take them for Course credit also known as college credits. Elective classes are also offered such as the fine arts, music, and business.

Advanced Placement courses offered include AP English Literature, AP Spanish Literature, AP French Literature, AP United States History, AP Chemistry and AP Biology. A new Advanced Placement class that was added for the 2010–2011 school year is AP Art History which will involve students in the aspects of art and origins of paintings and sculptures. There are four foreign language courses available for students to take as an elective. Portuguese I, II, & III, Spanish I, II & III, French I, II & III and Italian I, II & III. All students must have taken three years of a world language to obtain their credits.

Electives available for students to choose are Dance I, II & III, Chorus, Marching Band I, II, III (Marching Band is offered as a twelfth period course which is during after school hours), Journalism, Drama I & II, Criminal Justice I & II, Public Speaking & Debate I & II, Sociology, Women's Studies, Black Studies, Economics, Computer Science and Drawing and Painting I & II. There are more electives offered at Alexander Hamilton Preparatory Academy, as well as the Advancement Via Individual Determination (AVID) class which is a required course for every student.

Regulations
Students enrolled in the AHPA are expected to comply with all rules, regulations and policies of the Academy and the district. Students will be required to wear school uniforms, perform community service, and take ownership in the AVID program. The combination of rigorous and relevant courses, a variety of elective subjects, and the philosophy of the AVID program give students the opportunity to excel in high school and beyond.

In order for a student to qualify for graduation, they must complete 160 credits and perform 60 hours of community service by their senior year, 25 of which must be completed during senior year.

AVID
The Alexander Hamilton Preparatory Academy integrates a rigorous curriculum with the philosophies of the Advancement Via Individual Determination (AVID) program. AVID is a research-based instructional model that encourages students to prepare for and participate in a challenging college preparatory curriculum. In addition to enrolling in honors and AP level courses, students will receive academic support through a specially designed AVID elective, taught by AVID-trained instructors.

Clubs and organizations
Student Government Association
The Green Team
Yearbook Committee
Journalism Club
After school Chorus
Key Club
Game Club
Nature Club
The National Honor Society
Afterschool Tutoring
Shakesperience club

Athletics
The Alexander Hamilton Preparatory Academy does not have its own athletic teams. Instead the students participate in sports that represent the whole city of Elizabeth not just one academy. Students from all the Elizabeth Academies including Elizabeth High School are all on one sports team competing against other schools outside the city.

References

External links
 AHPA Website
 Directions to AHPA
 AHPA Information Video
 The AVID Website
 

2008 establishments in New Jersey
Education in Elizabeth
Educational institutions established in 2008
Middle States Commission on Secondary Schools
Public high schools in Union County